Gymnoascus is a genus of fungi within the Gymnoascaceae family. The genus, widely distributed in northern temperate areas, contains eight species.

References

External links

Eurotiomycetes genera
Onygenales
Taxa described in 1872